The Third Lee Kuan Yew Cabinet was the third Cabinet of Singapore formed by Prime Minister Lee Kuan Yew in 1968, after the 1968 Singaporean general election. The cabinet lasted until 1972, with one shuffle in 1970.

Ministers

Ministers of State and Parliamentary Secretaries

References 

Executive branch of the government of Singapore
Lists of political office-holders in Singapore
Cabinets established in 1968
Lee Kuan Yew